Valeo Confectionery, formerly known as Tangerine Confectionery and Toms Confectionery, is a British confectionery company with its headquarters in Pontefract, West Yorkshire. Since 2006, it had grown through acquisitions into one of the largest independent confectionery companies in Europe before acquisition by Valeo Foods and the fourth largest sweet maker in the United Kingdom. The company has  six factories: Blackburn, Blackpool, Cleckheaton, Liverpool, Pontefract and York.

History

In January 2006, Toms Confectionery changed its name to Tangerine Confectionery and altered its branding following the purchase of the company by a new management team from Toms International of Denmark. The UK arm of Tom's had been created through the acquisition of three traditional confectionery companies, Taveners, Daintee and Parrs, over a ten-year period, between 1992 and 2001.

Originally the company had been mainly an own-label supplier in England. The company acquired the Taveners, Dainty and Parrs businesses from Toms of Denmark later in January 2006. In April it was voted the best own-label confectionery supplier in the UK by The Grocer magazine. In August, the company acquired the confectionery arm of Blackpool-based Burton's Foods and so increase turnover of the company to £60m, making it the largest independent confectionery company in the UK.

In January 2008, the company purchased Yorkshire based Monkhill Confectionery from Cadbury plc in a £58 million deal, with factories in Cleckheaton, Pontefract and York as well as a distribution centre in Holmewood, North East Derbyshire. The purchase included the Barratts, Sharps of York, Jameson's, Trebor Basset Mints, Butterkist and Pascall lines. Two months later Tangerine claimed there were no plans to close its York factory, despite ordering workers to stay at home in Easter week.

Two months later, staff in Blackpool voted in favour of industrial action after turning down a 2.5% pay offer.

In April 2009 the company was ranked 23rd in the PricewaterhouseCoopers Profit Track 100, published by The Sunday Times, and was the highest North West entry in the table, which lists the 100 private UK's companies with the fastest growing profits. In August it received a quality Halal Seal of Approval, from the Halal Food Authority, for 150 products within its Barratt, MOJO, Princess and Taveners Proper Sweets ranges

In March 2010, the company was found guilty of two counts of breaching Health and Safety laws, following the death of an employee at its Poole, Dorset factory. A fine of £300,000 for each count plus costs was imposed. In 2012, it was announced that the factory would close in 2013.

2012 saw the acquisition of Smith Kendon, manufacturer of York Fruits jelly sweets.

On 5 February 2013 the company was delisted by the Halal Food Authority.

In 2014, Tangerine announced the closure of its Clifton Road factory in Blackpool. It said its other Blackpool site in Vicarage Lane would remain open.

In August 2018, Valeo Foods announced completion of its acquisition of Tangerine Confectionery.  In December 2019, the company's name was changed to Valeo Confectionery.

Operations

Tangerine Confectionery has factories in Blackburn, Blackpool, Cleckheaton, Liverpool, Pontefract and York. Its head office, originally in Blackpool, is now in Pontefract in West Yorkshire.

Brands and products

See also
 List of confectionery brands

References

External links

 Official website

Food and drink companies established in 1986
Companies based in Wakefield
British chocolate companies
Confectionery companies of the United Kingdom
British companies established in 1986
1986 establishments in England